Timothy Charles Parker (born 19 June 1955) is a British executive. As of 2020 he was the chairman of the National Trust, Post Office Ltd, and Her Majesty's Courts and Tribunals Service (HMCTS). He was replaced in February 2022 as chairman of the National Trust by René Olivieri and will leave the Post Office Ltd in Autumn 2022.

From 1986 to 2014, he was successively the CEO of Kenwood, Clarks Shoes, Kwik-Fit, the AA, and Samsonite, and led each company in a turnaround. He was appointed the chairman of the National Trust in 2014, chairman of Post Office Ltd in 2015, and chairman of HMCTS in 2018.

Early life and education 
Parker was born in Aldershot, Hampshire, in 1955. The son of an army officer, he spent much of his childhood abroad. He was educated at Abingdon School in Abingdon, Oxfordshire, leaving in 1973.

He attended Pembroke College, Oxford, where he was chairman of the Oxford University Labour Club. He holds an MA in Philosophy, Politics and Economics from Oxford (1977), and an MSc in Business Studies from the London Business School (1981).

Career 
After graduating from Oxford, Parker worked as a junior economist in HM Treasury from 1977 to 1979. In 1981, after obtaining his business degree, he joined Thorn EMI as assistant to Sir William Barlow, chairman of the engineering group. 

At the age of 26, he was appointed CEO of Blakeslee, a small engineering subsidiary of Thorn EMI in Chicago. After two years he had the business sold off as lacking in scalability. Returning to the UK, he headed Crypto Peerless, a Birmingham company manufacturing foodservice equipment, which in a little over two years he took from break-even to £800,000 in profits.

In 1986, he was appointed CEO of the appliance manufacturer Kenwood. In 1989 he led a management-based leveraged buyout of the business, with backing from the private-equity firm Candover Investments; the company was purchased for £52 million. It was listed on London Stock Exchange in 1992 at a valuation of £104 million. 

In 1996, Parker became CEO of Clarks Shoes. He substantially reorganised the company, closed 20 factories, moved manufacturing overseas, and revived the Clarks brand with more up-to-date shoe styles. Within six years the company's profitability increased by 150%, and by the time he left in 2002 it had revenues approaching £1 billion a year. 

In August 2002, he was hired as CEO of Kwik-Fit, after CVC Capital Partners acquired the company from Ford. He undertook a major restructuring of the business, including cutting 3,000 jobs. During his tenure as CEO, profits increased by 250%. The business was sold to PAI Partners in 2005 for £800 million, with Parker earning £20 million from the deal.

In 2004, CVC Capital Partners and Permira purchased the AA from Centrica for £1.75 billion, and Parker was appointed CEO. During the next two years, he carried out a fundamental restructuring programme; one-third of the company's 10,000 jobs were cut in the process. Parker was subsequently dubbed the "Prince of Darkness" by trade unions. The AA's EBITDA increased from £120 million in 2004 to £305 million in 2007. In 2007, the AA merged with Saga at an enterprise value of £3.35 billion.

From 7 July to 19 August 2008, Parker served as First Deputy Mayor of London, under Boris Johnson. He was also chairman of Transport for London and CEO of the Greater London Authority during that period, prior to resigning. 

In November 2008, he was appointed non-executive chairman of Samsonite, and was made CEO in January 2009. CVC Capital Partners had acquired Samsonite in July 2007, and the ensuing financial crisis of 2007–2008 hit the luggage company hard due to the declines in international air travel and consumer spending; 2008 earnings before interest, tax, depreciation, and amortisation collapsed from $120 million to only $40 million globally. Parker was brought in to turn the company around. He restructured the company, replaced its management, cut jobs, closed stores, and invested funds in new suitcase designs and marketing. In 2010, earnings before interest, tax, depreciation, and amortisation revived to $192 million. The company was listed on the Hong Kong Stock Exchange in June 2011, raising $1.25 billion in the IPO. Following his appointment to the National Trust, in August 2014 Parker resigned as CEO of Samsonite, effective 1 October 2014; he remained on as non-executive chairman of the company.

In 2009, he was the lead investor in the private-equity acquisition of British Pathé, and the historic film archive launched a newly established and dedicated London office, and a new, updated, quicker, and simpler website. He remains a director and owner of the British Pathé film archive.

In 2014 Parker was appointed chairman of the National Trust, an unpaid role. In May 2021 the National Trust announced that he would be stepping down in October 2021.

Parker became chairman of Post Office Ltd in October 2015, in the midst of a long dispute between the Post Office and a number of subpostmasters over problems with its Horizon computer system. In June 2016, he told subpostmasters that replacing the Horizon system would "incur considerable risk". The faulty Horizon system was responsible for hundreds of subpostmasters being accused of accounting fraud and theft since its installation in 1999, and dozens of false convictions. In December 2019, the Post Office agreed to a £58 million settlement, and a High Court judge ruled that bugs, errors, and defects in the Horizon system caused shortfalls in branch accounts. In October 2020, after the Post Office conceded appeals by 44 former subpostmasters to overturn convictions linked to the Horizon accounting scandal, Parker issued an apology, stating "I am sincerely sorry on behalf of the Post Office for historical failings which seriously affected some postmasters. Post Office is resetting its relationship with postmasters with reforms that prevent such past events ever happening again. Post Office wishes to ensure that all postmasters entitled to claim civil compensation because of their convictions being overturned are recompensed as quickly as possible. Therefore, we are considering the best process for doing that.". The prosecution by Post Office Ltd of 732 subpostmasters in relation to the faulty Horizon system is described as the biggest miscarriage of justice in British history.

In April 2018, Parker was appointed chairman of Her Majesty's Courts and Tribunals Service (HMCTS), effective 27 April 2018.

Additional board memberships
As of 2020, in addition to being chairman of Samsonite, Parker is an advisor to CVC Capital Partners.

He is also a trustee of the Royal Academy of Music.

Personal life 
Parker is married and has four children.

See also
 List of Old Abingdonians

References

Living people
1955 births
People educated at Abingdon School
National Trust people
Alumni of the University of London
Alumni of London Business School